The Fashion Fund is a Hulu web series that originally aired in 2011. The show was restarted in 2014 on Ovation TV.

History
On Ovation TV, it began on January 22, 2014, with Anna Wintour stars in The Fashion Fund, a documentary about the CFDA/Vogue Fashion Fund competition. The Fashion Fund was a Hulu web series in 2011.  The Fashion Fund will feature Diane von Furstenberg, designer and Council of Fashion Designers of America president; Jenna Lyons, J. Crew president; Andrew Rosen, Theory cofounder and chief executive officer; and Ken Downing, fashion director and senior vice present of Neiman Marcus.

The series premiered on June 10, 2015, in Australia on Bio.

The season 3, with 10 episodes, was shown on Amazon Prime in 2016.

References

2011 American television series debuts
2010s American reality television series
2010s American documentary television series
English-language television shows
Documentary web series
American non-fiction web series
Television shows set in New York City
Fashion-themed television series
Fashion journalism